Sanborn Creek is a stream in the U.S. state of Georgia. It empties into Lake Seminole.

It is unknown why the name "Sanborn Creek" was applied to this stream.

References

Rivers of Georgia (U.S. state)
Rivers of Decatur County, Georgia